"Santa Monica" (subtitled "Watch the World Die" in Europe) is a song by American rock band Everclear, from their 1995 album Sparkle and Fade. The song was written by the band's lead singer, Art Alexakis. Though it was not officially released as a single in the United States, American radio stations played "Santa Monica" enough for it to reach number 29 on the Billboard Hot 100 Airplay chart and top the Billboard Hot Mainstream Rock Tracks chart for three weeks in 1996. It became a top-forty hit in Australia, Canada, New Zealand, and the United Kingdom; it is the band's highest-charting single in Australia.

Background and content
In an October 2003 interview with Songfacts, Alexakis explained the song:

When Alexakis was a teenager, his girlfriend committed suicide; shortly thereafter, Alexakis attempted the same by jumping off the Santa Monica Pier in southern California. 

Following the terrorist attacks on September 11, 2001, the song was placed on the list of post-9/11 inappropriate titles distributed by Clear Channel Communications.

Track listings

US 7-inch jukebox vinyl
A. "Santa Monica" – 3:12
B. "Heroin Girl" (live) – 2:51

UK limited-edition 7-inch red vinyl single
A1. "Santa Monica (Watch the World Die)"
A2. "American Girl" (Tom Petty cover, KDGE version)
B1. "Fire Maple Song" (KDGE version)
B2. "Strawberry" (KDGE version)

UK CD1
 "Santa Monica (Watch the World Die)"
 "Heroin Girl" (KDGE version)
 "Summerland" (KDGE version)
 "Sin City" (AC/DC cover)

UK CD2
 "Santa Monica (Watch the World Die)"
 "Strawberry" (KDGE version)
 "Fire Maple Song" (KDGE version)
 "American Girl" (Tom Petty cover, KDGE version)

European maxi-CD single
 "Santa Monica (Watch the World Die)"
 "Heroin Girl" (acoustic version)
 "Happy Hour" (demo)
 "Sin City" (AC/DC cover)

Dutch maxi-CD single
 "Santa Monica (Watch the World Die)"
 "Strawberry" (live)
 "Fire Maple Song" (live)
 "Santa Monica (Watch the World Die)" (live)

Australian CD single
 "Santa Monica" (album version)
 "Heroin Girl" (acoustic version)
 "Don't Change" (INXS cover)
 "Sin City" (AC/DC cover)

Charts

Weekly charts

Year-end charts

References

1990s ballads
1995 singles
1995 songs
Capitol Records singles
Everclear (band) songs
Rock ballads
Songs about California
Songs about suicide
Songs written by Art Alexakis
Songs written by Craig Montoya
Songs written by Greg Eklund
Grunge songs